The Platform is a Syrian TV series created and written by Hozan Akko, produced by Mansoor Al Yabhouni Al Daheri, and directed by Rodrigo Kirchner.

The series is produced by Filmgate Abu Dhabi and shot in the United Arab Emirates. The 12-episode first season premiered on Netflix on September 3, 2020, and stars Syrian actor Maxim Khalil as Karam, who is struggling to keep his family together after his father (Salloum Haddad) is imprisoned on terrorism charges.

Overview 
The series revolves around the programmer, Karam El Sayed played by Maxim Khalil looks into his truth-finding mission. He had a more than complicated youth. His brother Adam (Samer Ismail) was misused by a family friend and Extremist group leader Naji (Khaled El Sayed). His abusive father, a carpenter, played by Salloum Haddad, is involved in the same group. This led to him mistrusting every person he meets and eventually creating an open-source-based truth finder, which he calls "the platform."
His adult life story starts at his first peak of success. He just published his first book in Los Angeles when the situation escalates. He needs to go back to his parents' city and join his family in a tragic situation. The mistrust in his father and his friends is higher than ever, including his youth friend Sarah (Leen Gherra).

Cast 

 Maxim Khalil, Karam El Sayed, 12 episodes, 2020 
 Khaled Alkeesh, Zico, 11 episodes, 2020 
 Alnemr Abdulmohsen, Nasser, 11 episodes, 2020 
 Khaled El Sayed, Naji, 11 episodes, 2020 
 Leen Gherra, Sarah, 10 episodes, 2020 
 Samer Ismail, Adam, 10 episodes, 2020 
 Mahira Abdelaziz, Sheikha, 9 episodes, 2020 
 Yaser Al-Neyadi, Seif, 9 episodes, 2020 
 Reham Alkassar, Amal, 9 episodes, 2020 
 Salloum Haddad, Hazem El Sayed, 9 episodes, 2020 
 Shadi Al Safadi, Adnen, 8 episodes, 2020 
 Dean Cain, John, 8 episodes, 2020 
 Saoud Al Kaabi, Fahed,7 episodes, 2020 
 Alaa Al Zuabi, Amin, 4 episodes, 2020 
 Moatasem Al-Nahar, Ivan, 4 episodes, 2020 
 Ahmad Aljasmi, Abu Ali, 4 episodes, 2020 
 Yara Qassem, Eman, 3 episodes, 2020 
 Samar Sami, Mom El Sayed, 2 episodes, 2020 
 Adham Murched, Ramzi, 1 episode, 2020 
 Sabrina Schimanszky, Investigator, 1 episode, 2020

Critical reception 
CNN Arabic film critic Samia Ayesh wrote: "The real star of the show was the technical mastery, which we are not used to in Arabic works." She added: "Rarely was there a scene that was boring or too long."

References

External links 
 
 Saudi News

Arabic television series
2020 television series debuts
Arabic-language Netflix original programming